This is a list of cities in Rwanda:

Cities

Kigali province 
 Kigali (capital)
 Kicukiro
 Rutongo
 Kacyiru

Southern province 
Nyanza   (provincial capital)
Muhanga
Kamonyi
Ruhango
Gisagara
Nyaruguru
Nyamagabe
Huye

Northern province 
Byumba (provincial capital)
Ruhengeri

Western province 
Kibuye (provincial capital)
Cyangugu
Gisenyi

Eastern province 
Rwamagana (provincial capital)
Kibungo

Cities in Rwanda by population

See also 
 Geography of Rwanda
 List of cities in East Africa
 Urban planning in Africa: Rwanda

References 

Rwanda, List of cities in
 
Rwanda
Cities